Acantholycosa pedestris is a wolf spider species in the genus Acantholycosa found in Europe. It was first described by Eugène Simon, the French naturalist.

See also 
 List of Lycosidae species

References 

Lycosidae
Spiders of Europe
Spiders described in 1876